Virginal Co Ordinates is an album by Eyvind Kang, released in 2003 by I Dischi Di Angelica and reissued in 2004 by Ipecac Recordings.

Track listing
All tracks written by Eyvind Kang.

 "Go in a Good Way to a Better Place" – 4:10
 "I Am the Dead" – 5:08
 "Doorway to the Sun" – 19:23
 "Occultum Lapidem" – 4:38
 "Harbour of the NADE" – 2:50
 "Taksim" – 2:38
 "Sidi Bou Said" – 5:41
 "Virginal Co-Ordinates" – 10:39
 "Innocent Eye, Crystal See" – 12:58
 "Marriage of Days" – 4:33

References

Eyvind Kang albums
2003 albums